The Mazda MX-5 (NA) (sold in Japan as the  and in North America as the Mazda MX-5 Miata) is the first generation of the Mazda MX-5 manufactured from 1989 to 1997. Inspired by the post-war era British sports cars, the MX-5 rejuvenated interest in roadsters after the demise of cars such as the MG B and Triumph Spitfire. Since its debut, the MX-5 has won numerous automotive awards and has become the world's best selling sports car.

Background
The MX-5, with production code NA, was made available for delivery to buyers worldwide in the following dates: May 1989 (as a 1990 model) in the US and Canada; September 1, 1989 in Japan; and 1990 in Europe. An optional hardtop was made available at the same time, in sheet moulding compound (SMC). Demand initially outstripped production, fueled by enthusiastic press reviews.

In Japan, the car was not badged as a Mazda, as the company was in the process of launching different marques for deluxe models, similar to Nissan's Infiniti, Honda's Acura and Toyota's Lexus. Instead, the Mazda MX-5 was sold as the Eunos Roadster, and was joined by the MX-3/AZ-3/Eunos Presso (based on Japanese Mazda dealerships). The exterior dimensions and the engine displacement were also in compliance with Japanese Government compact car regulation.

The body shell of the NA was all-steel with a lightweight aluminum hood. Without options, the NA weighed only . Suspension was an independent double wishbone on all four wheels, with an anti-roll bar at the front and rear. Four-wheel disc brakes, ventilated at the front, were behind alloy wheels with 185/60HR14 radial tires. The base model came with stamped steel wheels from the then-current 323/Protege.

The engine employs an electronic fuel injection system using a vane-type air flow meter and an electronic ignition system with a camshaft angle sensor instead of a distributor. This engine, codenamed B6ZE(RS), was specifically designed for the MX-5 and featured a lightened crankshaft, flywheel, and aluminum sump with cooling fins. An MX-5 with the optional automatic transmission had its 1.6L engine tuned to develop peak torque at lower rpm's (136 Nm, 100 lbf-ft at 4000 rpm) to better mate with the automatic transmission gearing and torque requirements. This tuning resulted in a lower peak power of 78.5 kW (105 bhp) at 6500 rpm.

The standard transmission was a 5-speed manual, derived from the one used in the Mazda 929/Luce (also rear-wheel drive). The gear shift was the subject of close attention during development, with engineers told to make it shift in as small a gear pattern as possible and with minimal effort. In Japan and the US, an optional automatic transmission was also offered. The Japanese and American markets also received an optional viscous limited-slip differential, although it was only available for cars with a manual transmission. To achieve the low introductory price, the base model was stripped. It had steel wheels, manual steering, roll-up windows, and no stereo or air conditioning. Power steering, air conditioning, and stereo were added as standard equipment in later years.

Motor Trend's July 1989 test gave a 0- time of 8.9 seconds. The NA with an automatic transmission reached 97 km/h (60 mph) in 9.9 seconds and had a top speed of 181 km/h (112 mph).

In 1993, 1,500 LE (Limited Edition) cars were produced. This model featured red leather interior, upgraded stereo, Nardi shift knob, leather-wrapped steering wheel, cruise control, limited-slip differential, power windows, power mirrors, power steering, air conditioning, BBS wheels, Bilstein shocks, front and rear spoilers, ABS brakes, stainless sill plates, and Harley style peanut tank door speaker trim. All 1993 LE cars came in black.

For the 1994 model year, the first-generation MX-5 was freshened with the introduction of the more powerful  BP-ZE engine, dual airbags placed in a redesigned dashboard, the addition of a Mazda badge on the front fascia in the US and a limited-slip differential in some markets. The chassis was substantially braced to meet new side-impact standards, most visibly by adding a "track bar" between the seatbelt towers inside the car, but also to the front and rear subframes. Also, 1994 and 1995 were the only years in which Mazda offered a light metallic blue paint (Laguna Blue Mica), making these cars rare collectors cars to some. 1994 also saw the introduction of the "R" package, a sport-themed package with Bilstein shocks, stiffer sway bars, retuned springs, subtle front and rear underbody spoilers, and a Torsen LSD. Air conditioning was optional, but the "R" package was not available with power steering, leather, or an automatic transmission. It can also be identified by a red Miata badge on the rear instead of the usual black. No body style changes were made, however. Halfway through the 1997 model year the hazard light button was changed to a black button with red symbol as opposed to the earlier red button with white symbol.

Performance was thus improved slightly, because the additional weight was more than offset by the extra power. This lower-powered model did not receive all the additional chassis bracing of the new . Japanese and U.S. models offered an optional Torsen LSD, which was far more durable than the previous viscous differential.

There were a number of trim levels and special editions available, determined by local Mazda marketing departments. In the US, the base model was offered for US$13,995 at launch and was very basic, with manual windows, steel wheels, and without air conditioning or power steering. The "A Package" offered power steering, a leather-wrapped steering wheel, aluminum alloy wheels and cassette stereo. The "B Package" added power windows, along with cruise control and headrest speakers, while the "C Package" included a tan interior and top with leather seats. The "R Package" was for racing, and the annual special editions were formalized as "M Editions". These included all of the luxury options from the "C Package" as well as special paint and, sometimes, special wheels. In the UK, to celebrate Mazda's 24 hours of Le Mans win, Mazda brought out a special edition of the MX-5, with the winner's color scheme (see Mazda 787B) and came equipped with BBR (Brodie Brittain Racing) turbo conversion; the car is one of the most sought after special edition cars of the MX-5s.

The first generation MX-5 was phased out after the 1997 model year (with the exception of 400 limited edition Berkeley models sold only in the UK in 1998 to mark the end of the NA), with the final 1,500 NAs produced for the US market being the "STO" ("Special Touring Option") versions.

Special editions

1991 Limited Edition (UK)
250 examples sold from March '91, produced in British Racing Green with tan interior, to celebrate the 1st anniversary of the MX-5 in the UK. These have a numbered brass plaque on the passenger-side padded dashboard and on the front of the Owners Book, and are fitted with colour-matched 15" OZ alloy wheels from MSW (Mazda Sports Workshop) which are often mistaken for BBS, but which are unique to this model. Other features were power steering, central locking, a wooden steering wheel, hand-brake grip and gear knob, and a distinctive analogue clock.  The engine is the standard 1.6L.

1991 Special Edition
Limited to 3,997 units in the United States / 1,051 in Canada, this edition of the MX-5 NA was offered only in British racing green with tan leather interior and tonneau cover and featured a wooden Nardi shift knob and handbrake lever, stainless steel door sills, air conditioning, CD player, cruise control, and headrest speakers.

1992 Sunburst
A US$250 option for the exclusive Sunburst Yellow color, limited to 1,519 units in the USA / 503 in Canada.

1992 Black Miata
Limited to 4,625 units, this edition was offered only in Brilliant Black with tan leather interior, Nardi shift knob and handbrake lever and special 14-inch BBS wheels.

1993 Limited Edition
Limited to 1,505 units in the USA / 300 in Canada, this Limited Edition model was equipped similarly to the 1992 Black Miata, but with red leather interior, sport suspension, front and rear spoilers, rear skirt, air conditioning, headrest speakers and 14-inch BBS wheels.

1993 Energia Electric Vehicle
In 1993, Mazda partnered with the Chugoku Electric Power Company to produce an electric prototype called the "Energia Electric Vehicle." It was also significantly heavier, weighing .

1994 M-Edition
Limited to 3,000 units for the USA, the M-Edition introduced the Montego Blue Mica exterior color and was equipped similarly to the 1992 Black Miata, but with power windows, power mirrors, a Torsen limited-slip differential and special M-Edition badges.

1994-1997 R-Package
While the R-Package was never officially a special edition, only 1841 were produced for the USA. The R-package was sold with the upgraded Torsen rear differential, stiffer springs and sway bars, Bilstein shock absorbers, front air dam, and rear spoiler. There was not any option for power steering, an automatic transmission, or leather seats. Air conditioning was optional.

1995 M-Edition
An upgrade to the 1994 M-Edition in Merlot Mica with adjustable headrests and 15-inch BBS wheels, this M-Edition MX-5 was limited to 3,500 units for the USA.

1995 M Speedster Concept
A one-off concept featuring large fog lights and a smaller windshield with the side mirrors mounted on it.

1996 M-Edition
The 1996 M-Edition was in Starlight Blue Mica and added an alarm system and used 15-inch Enkei wheels. A total of 3,000 units were manufactured for the USA.

1996 M Coupe Concept
Introduced at the 1996 New York International Auto Show, this concept was a fixed hardtop version of the MX-5.

1997 M-Edition
The final M-Edition was offered in Marina Green Mica and limited to 3,000 units in the USA.

1997 Speedster Edition
For the Canadian market, the Speedster Edition was the same color as the US-market's 1997 M-Edition in Marina Green Mica but had the 1996 M-Edition's Enkei wheels, "Speedster Edition" badging, and a Torsen LSD, but black cloth seats.  Limited to 150 units in Canada.

1997 Special Touring Option
Advertised by Mazda USA as "Still The One" and limited to 1,500 units, the Special Touring Option (STO) was offered in Twilight Blue Mica and featured the exterior options of the 1996 M-Edition, but lacked the Torsen differential, cruise control, premium stereo, and hardtop (which elicited the other nickname of "Stuff Taken Off").

M2 special editions
A small range of Eunos Roadster units were assembled by the M2 Incorporated. Founded in November 1991, M2, also known as "Mazda Too", was Mazda's new off-line planning / niche-house / Research & Development company back in the early '90s. The M2 Corp. employees had noble intentions — creating niche-mobiles derived from Mazda's volume products. Although M2's basic mission involved focusing on the "soft" aspects of vehicle design in an attempt to create more specifically targeted niche variants, the changes to the off-line cars would go well beyond mere cosmetics.

Heading the M2 operation was Mr. Masakatsu Kato, original father of the Miata (Eunos Roadster) in Japan, as well as creator of several Mazda concept vehicles. Kato-san was assisted by Hirotaka Tachibana, development engineer responsible for the superb dynamics of the Mazda FC (second generation RX-7) and the NA Roadster. M2 Corp. was based out of Tokyo, Japan. M2-Corp was a 100% owned subsidiary of Mazda, and it was closed by Mazda in 1995. Mazda kept a similar program going with the Mazdaspeed vehicles, and then in the late '90s Mazdaspeed was absorbed into Mazda as a subsidiary company in Mazda Auto Tokyo. There were many types of M2 branded vehicles between 1991 and 1995, beginning with the 1001 up to the 1031 Cafe Racer (Dec-91).

M2-1001 Cafe Roadster (Limited 1/300)
M2 Corp. released the M2-1001 Roadster in December 1991. It was a special "Limited Production" Roadster variant that was a short production run of only 300 units, in a special Blue/Black Mica Paint, with a sticker price of $26,000. Prospective buyers were required to show up in person at M2's Tokyo headquarters to register for a lottery to place an order for this extremely limited Roadster.

This upscale Roadster was M2's first turn-key, race-ready offering. A list of popular features, while not exhaustive, is as follows: functional front airdam with integrated fog lamps, vintage aero mirrors, 4-point roll bar, vintage gauge cluster, fixed back bucket seats, polished 3-spoke steering wheel, stiffer suspension package with M2 specific rates, polished aluminum strut brace, upgraded exhaust by HKS, intake system, 1.6 L motor with new aggressive pistons, upgraded camshaft, lightweight flywheel, LSD cooling intake, manual steering, manual windows (A/C was optional), racing pedals, centerless console with matching shortened radio bezel, aluminum gas filler cap, a more aggressive wheel & tire package (15- x 6-inch Panasport rims), and a rear spoiler (which became standard for the R package). Once released, it proved so popular that people were paying up to $35,000 for one.

M2-1002 Vintage Roadster (Limited 1/300)
M2 Corp. released its second Roadster in November 1992, with a slightly different front bumper but all the same items as the previous 1001 Roadster. This one did not do as well as the 1001.

M2-1028 Street Competition Roadster (Limited 1/300)
M2-Corp released its third Roadster in February 1994, based on the original "Jinba Ittai" concept made by Toshihiko Hirai. This was billed as a track-ready Roadster. (The US saw a cheaper version known as the R-Package.) Offered in Chaste White or Brilliant Black only, this Roadster used the new 1.8 L powerplant with upgraded pistons, camshafts, and other similar goodies as the previous 1001 and 1002. The only real changes were a new set of lightweight side mirrors, MOMO Steering Wheel, centerless console, racing seats, racing tow hook,  a set of lower lip spoilers (R-Package), and a newly designed "Duck-Tail" trunk lid with integrated spoiler. It also came with a 6-point roll cage, but no soft-top, instead featuring a tarp that stretched over the cage. With optional FRP Hardtop with plexiglass rear window for more weight savings coming in at only .

Turbo conversions 
Brodie Brittain Racing (BBR) of Brackley, England, have had a long history of involvement with NA models in the UK, having supplied parts and equipment for a dealer supplied BBR Turbo version of the car between 1990 and 1991. The kit consisted of 68 parts and was covered by a full dealer warranty. They were supplied and fitted to around 750 UK spec cars, including for the 1991 'Le Mans' special edition, with a further 150 kits being supplied overseas. Two decades later in 2011, BBR now offer a turn-key refurbishment package for old NA MX-5's, again including a turbo charger kit. The estimated top speed is now , with 0–97 (60 mph) approached in 5.5 seconds. The turbo charger used is a Garrett AiResearch GT25 ball bearing unit, and the package also includes an air-to-air intercooler, and a digital piggy-back ECU to control timing, fueling, and boost pressures. Subject to a satisfactory donor car, the refurbishment and turbo upgrade package includes rust treatment, a paint respray, new seats, wheels, and other trim. As of January 2011 the cost for a 'refreshed' BBR MX-5 Turbo is £7,500.

In the United States, NA (and later model) turbo conversions are available from companies like Flyin' Miata. The conversions use mainly Garrett turbochargers (GT2560R) and are available as a kit or fully installed. Flyin' Miata also offers a CARB-legal kit as well.

Factory restoration program

In 2018, Mazda began a factory restoration program for Eunos Roadster owners in Japan. The work is performed at the Hiroshima Factory where all Roadsters are built. The program offers a choice for each car to be fully restored to factory-spec using OEM parts, or selected restoration options. All work is then certified by TÜV Rheinland. When the program was announced over 600 owners applied for the restoration program. At the Japanese language website, not all NA series can be restored and conditions are listed.

On September 27, 2018, Mazda unveiled the first fully restored Roadster: a 1992 V-Special in British racing green with tan leather interior. The car belongs to tomato farmer Keiji Nishimoto, who has owned it since new.

The Automotive Researchers' and Journalists' Conference of Japan gave the program a Special Award for Classic Car Restoration Service at the 2018 RJC Car of the Year Awards.

On October 28, 2019, Mazda announced that they will introduce select reproduction parts for North American MX-5 Miata NA owners. All parts will be remanufactured using modern methods and materials while retaining the original look and feel of that era. Enkei will reproduce the original alloy wheels, but with a lighter weight and a more durable finish.

Technical specifications (UK)

Awards and recognition
 Automobile Magazine 1990 "Automobile of the Year".
 Car and Drivers 10Best list from 1990-1992.
2018 RJC Car of the Year Special Award: Classic Car Restoration Service.
A red 1990 Eunos Roadster is in the collection of the Haynes International Motor Museum at Sparkford near Yeovil in England, where it is on display in the Red Room which is dedicated to sports and touring cars, all of which are in a shade of red.

References

External links

 (NA Roadster Restore parts listing)
 Japanese Website Information Restore Program 

Mazda MX-5
1990s cars

Cars introduced in 1989
Euro NCAP roadster sports cars
Front mid-engine, rear-wheel-drive vehicles
Retro-style automobiles
Roadsters
Cars discontinued in 1997